Fonadhoo (Dhivehi: ފޮނަދޫ) is the capital island in Laamu atoll of the Maldives.

The island has three villages: Barasil (northernmost), Medhuavah (in the middle) and Kurigam (southernmost). The population of the island was around 2000 in 2013.

History 

Most of the history (geological and behavioural) of Fonadhoo and its people has not been recorded. The island is considered a Gaamathee Rah - an island formed on a coral mountain, facing one side to the bay (Etherevari) and the other side to the open sea (Fuhtaru-Huvadhoo Kandu). It is believed that the island has a rich culture and is very much related to the history of the Maldives. Important historical places in the island include the Old Friday Mosque, a few sheltered tombs (Magbarah) and old mosques and cemeteries in many parts of the island.

Geography 

Being the administrative capital of Laamu Atoll, the atmosphere is vibrant with a lot of vegetation.

Demography

Economy 

Most of the people are civil servants or work in Kadhdhoo Domestic Airport or in Maandhoo Fisheries Complex. Some are small scale farmers and others self-employed. At present and since the last decade there are no open sea fishing boats. A few boat owners exist with small reef fishing boats and two boats that cargo goods to and from Male'. The island has a low per capita income but has a regular flow of income which contributes to its slow progress.

Education 

Starting from the days of Bodu Madharusa, the island has had a government school which includes grades 1 to 12. There are two other preschools (arafa Preschool in Medhuavah and Barru Preschool in Barasil). The island has an average level of education with very few degree and masters holders and no PhD holders to date.

Transport
The island is connected by causeway to Gan island and Kadhdhoo.

Notable people 

One of the important personalities of Fonadhoo is Abdul Kareem Kaleyfaanu of Finivaage. He was among the first batch of Dhaarul Igama (دارالأقامۃ) students. He served the government for 48 years. Within this period he sincerely served as the Bodu Katheebu (Island Chief) for 37 years. When he died on 31 July 2004, he was a state pensioner holding the post of Raajjethereyge Khaassa Eheetheriyaa (Special Envoy of the islanders) at the Ministry of Atolls Administration (now Ministry of Home Affairs). He contributed to the literature of Maldives by writing articles of different genres for the Faithoora magazine and several poems. Much of his work is not published. He was married to Aminath Ahmed (Aimina Manike) with 7 children and 13 grandchildren.

References

Islands of the Maldives